Torquemada may refer to:

People 

 Juan de Torquemada (cardinal) (1388–1468), Spanish cardinal and ecclesiastical writer
 Tomás de Torquemada (1420–1498), prominent leader of the Spanish Inquisition
 Antonio de Torquemada (c. 1507–1569), Spanish writer
 Fray Juan de Torquemada (c. 1562–1624), Spanish friar, missionary and historian of the New World
 Edward Powys Mathers (1892–1939) (pseudonym Torquemada), British crossword setter

Fiction 

 Alonzo Torquemada, a character on the HBO drama series Oz
 Horatio Torquemada Marley, Elaine Marley's grandfather in the Monkey Island series
 Las novelas de Torquemada, four novels by Spanish author Benito Pérez Galdós:
Torquemada en la hoguera (1889)
Torquemada en la Cruz (1893)
Torquemada en el purgatorio (1894)
Torquemada y San Pedro (1895)
 Torquemada (play), an 1869 poem and an 1882 play by Victor Hugo about the life of Tomás de Torquemada
 Torquemada (comics), the main villain (Tomás de Torquemada) from the comic strip Nemesis the Warlock in the British comic 2000 AD
 Torquemada, a member of the Green Lantern Corps in the DC Comics universe
 Torquemada, a fortress in the 2010 video game Red Dead Redemption
 Señor Torquemada, horloger de Tolède, the Clockmaker in Ravel's opera L'heure espagnole

Places 

 Torquemada, Palencia, Spain

Music 

 "Torquemada 71", a song by doom metal band Electric Wizard
 Torquemada, a vocal piece composed by Leonardo Balada